Murthel Cyrill Dwyth Groenhart (born October 10, 1986) is a Dutch-Surinamese kickboxer and mixed martial artist. Groenhart is the 2012 K-1 World MAX World Championship Tournament Champion and former Glory Welterweight Champion.

Kickboxing career

Early years
Groenhart began his kickboxing career fighting on small shows in the Netherlands. He made his SLAMM debut in 2006, losing both of his fights with the organization, including a decision loss to Leroy Kaestner at B-Klass level. In 2008, Groenhart was invited by the K-1 organization to take part in an eight-man tournament, which had originally been intended for heavyweights but was changed later for fighters around the 75 kg bracket. Groenhart won the competition in spectacular fashion, dispatching all three of his opponents by stoppage on the night to take the title in Milan.

It's Showtime
The performance at the K-1 tournament led to Groenhart being invited to take part in a fight within the It's Showtime organization – the Netherlands biggest kickboxing organization. He lost his debut to It's Showtime Reality winner Sem Braan but impressed enough to be invited back for further matches.  Although an impressive fighter with a good knockout ratio, Groenhart has had up and down performances within the organization, winning fights against the likes of Yassin Boudrouz and Joep Beerenpoot by knockout, but losing to Vladimir Moravcik and being knocked out by Ali Cenik, fights he should have been expected to do better in. Groenhart has also fought and lost to top class fighters such as Cosmo Alexandre and Nieky Holzken – with the loss against Holzken after an extension round, being slightly unfortunate for some who felt Groenhart deserved more.  Despite some inconsistent performances, Groenhart won the vacant E.M.T.A. European title at the start of 2010, defeating Amir Zeyada in an impressive showing.

K-1
Groenhart ventured up to the 79 kg division to face Marc de Bonte at Glory 2: Brussels on October 6, 2012 in Brussels, Belgium and scored another come-from-behind victory as he knocked his opponent out with a knee strike in the second round.

Groenhart went on to win the K-1 World MAX 2012 World Championship Tournament Final in Athens, Greece on December 15, 2012, stopping Yasuhiro Kido and Mike Zambidis before knocking out his stable-mate Artur Kyshenko in the final.

Glory

Early career
Groenhart faced Robin van Roosmalen at Glory 7: Milan in Milan, Italy on April 20, 2013, losing a unanimous decision after getting dropped in round one.

Groenhart lost to Davit Kiria via unanimous decision at Glory 10: Los Angeles - Middleweight World Championship Tournament in Ontario, California, United States on September 28, 2013. He joined the Blackzilians camp in preparation for the fight.

Groenhart was expected to fight Shemsi Beqiri on the Glory 14: Zagreb undercard in Zagreb, Croatia on March 8, 2014 but Beqiri withdrew due to an injury was replaced by Teo Mikelić. Mikelić dropped him with a right cross early in round one but Groenhart climbed off the canvas and went to work, opening a cut on the Croatian that prompted a doctor's stoppage after the first round.

Replacing his stablemate Artur Kyshenko who conceded that he would be unable to make the contracted weight of -71 kg/156 lb, Groenhart stepped in to face Dzhabar Askerov at Legend 3: Pour Homme in Milan, Italy on April 5, 2014. He was fortunate not to be counted by referee Atsushi Onari in the early goings after succumbing to knockdown courtesy of a left hook by Askerov, but he soon made quick work of the Russian, dropping him with a right hook before putting him away with a left hook inside the opening round.

He had another fight outside of Glory, when he fought in the Kunlun Fight four man tournament. In the quarter finals he faced Sitthichai Sitsongpeenong. He lost the fight in the third round by a head kick KO.

2015 Glory Contender Tournament
He returned to Glory during Glory 23, being scheduled to fight Chad Sugden. Murthel lost the fight by a split decision.

Despite the loss, he took part in the Welterweight Contender Tournament. He beat Nicola Gallo by TKO in the second round, as the fight was called by the ringside doctor due to a cut. In the finals he won a unanimous decision against Karim Ghajji.

Winning the tournament earned a title shot against Nieky Holzken. He lost the fight by a split decision. He afterwards fought Cédric Doumbé, but lost the fight by a unanimous decision.

Briefly leaving Glory, Groenhart took part in the 2015 WFL 76 kg tournament. In the semi finals he won a unanimous decision against Marco Pique. In the final he fought and beat Sem Braan by a third-round KO.

He fought Artur Kyshenko during Kunlun Fight 43. The fight went into an extra fourth round, where Kyshenko won a decision.

2016 Glory Contender Tournament
He returned to Glory to take part in the Welterweight Contender Tournament. He beat Karim Benmansour in the semifinals by a second-round TKO, after knocking Karim down three times. In the finals, he beat Yoann Kongolo by unanimous decision.

He fought Jonatan Oliveira during Kunlun Fight 50. Groenhart won the fight by a second-round TKO following three knockdowns.

Holzken trilogy
After winning the contender tournament, he fought Nieky Holzken for the third time in his career. Holzken convincingly won the fight by a unanimous decision.

After his failed title bid, he won his next three fights. He first fought Thongchai Sitsongpeenong during Glory 38 and won by a third-round TKO, Alan Scheinson during Glory 41, winning by split decision, and Harut Grigorian during Glory 42, winning by KO. The fight with Grigorian ended in controversy, as Grigorian's fans jumped into the ring after his loss and started a melee with Groenhart and his corner.

Title fights
Groenhart fought Cedric Doumbe in a rematch during Glory 44, for the Glory Welterweight title. Groenhart won the fight by a split decision.

Murthel was scheduled to make his first title defense against Harut Grigorian during Glory 50. Grigorian won the fight in the first round, by TKO.

Groenhart rebounded from his title loss with a second-round TKO finish of Mohammed Jaraya, but dropped a split decision in his next fight to Alim Nabiev.

Groenhart was scheduled to fight Cedric Doumbe for the Glory Welterweight title, held at the time by Doumbe. Doumbe suffered an elbow injury before the fight, and was replaced by Troy Jones, with Groenhart and Jones fighting for the interim title. Groenhart beat Jones by KO in the second round.

Groenhart and Doumbe were scheduled to unify the titles at Glory 76. The fight was rescheduled for November 7, 2020, due to the COVID-19 pandemic cancelling the first event. The fight with Doumbe was indefinitely postponed, as main event fighter Badr Hari contracted COVID-19 and due to a partial lockdown imposed by the Dutch government. The fight was rescheduled for December 19. Groenhart was forced to withdraw from the fight, due to an injury.

Groenhart's fight with Cédric Doumbé was rescheduled for Glory 77. He lost the fight by a second-round knockout.

Groenhart challenged Endy Semeleer for the Glory Welterweight Championship at Glory 85 on April 29, 2023.

Mixed martial arts career
Groenhart was scheduled to make his mixed martial arts debut against Ullubiy Ataev at Levels Fight League 3 on October 10, 2021. Ataev later withdrew from the bout and was replaced by Mohamed Soumah. Soumah later withdrew as well and was replaced by Kristof Kirsch. Groenhart beat Kirsch by unanimous decision.

Groenhart was expected to face Ammari Diedrick at Levels Fight League 4 on November 28, 2021. The event was later postponed for March 13, 2022 with Diedrick being replaced with Marcelino Kemna. Groenhart won the bout after knocking Kemna down with a flying knee and then finishing him with ground and pound.

Groenhart was expected to face Karim Ghajji at ARES 6 on May 20, 2022. The bout was later scrapped for undisclosed reasons.

Groenhart was booked to face Max Siewruk at Levels Fight League 6 on October 2, 2022. In a last minute substitution, Siewruk had to pull out of the bout and was replaced by Hyram Rodriguez. Groenhart won the bout via unanimous decision.

Titles
Glory
Glory Welterweight Championship (one time)
2016 Glory Welterweight Contender Tournament Winner
2015 Glory Welterweight Contender Tournament Winner

World Fight League
2016 WFL -76 kg Tournament Champion

K-1
K-1 World MAX 2012 World Championship Tournament Champion
2008 K-1 Italy Oktagon tournament champion −75 kg

E.M.T.A.
2010 E.M.T.A. K-1 rules European champion −76 kg

Angels of Fire
2007 Angels of Fire II tournament title −75 kg

Mixed martial arts record

|-
|Win
|align=center|3–0
|Hyram Rodriguez
|Decision (unanimous)
|Levels Fight League 6
|
|align=center|3
|align=center|5:00
|Amsterdam, Netherlands
|
|-
|Win
|align=center|2–0
|Marcelino Kemna
|TKO (flying knee and punches)
|Levels Fight League 4
|
|align=center|2
|align=center|2:04
|Amsterdam, Netherlands
|-
|Win
|align=center|1–0
|Kristof Kirsch
|Decision (Unanimous)
|Levels Fight League 3
|
|align=center|3
|align=center|5:00
|Amsterdam, Netherlands
|

Kickboxing record 

|-  style="background:#;"
| 2023-04-29 ||  ||align=left| Endy Semeleer || Glory 85 ||  ||  || ||  
|-
! style=background:white colspan=9 |
|-  style="background:#fbb;" 
| 2021-01-30 || Loss||align=left| Cédric Doumbé || Glory 77: Rotterdam || Rotterdam, Netherlands || KO (Overhand right) || 2 || 2:52
|-
! style=background:white colspan=9 |
|-
|- style="background:#cfc;"
| 2019-10-26|| Win||align=left| Troy Jones || Glory 70: Lyon || Lyon, France || KO (Punches) || 2 || 2:38  
|-
! style=background:white colspan=9 |
|- 
|-  style="background:#fbb;"
| 2019-03-09 || Loss||align=left| Alim Nabiev || Glory 64: Strasbourg  || Strasbourg, France || Decision (Split) || 3 || 3:00
|-  style="background:#cfc;"
| 2018-09-29 || Win ||align=left| Mohammed Jaraya || Glory 59: Amsterdam|| Amsterdam, Netherlands || TKO (Punches) || 2 || 1:05 
|-
|-  style="background:#fbb;"
| 2018-02-17 || Loss ||align=left| Harut Grigorian || Glory 50: Chicago|| United States || TKO (Referee stoppage) || 1 || 2:07 
|-
! style=background:white colspan=9 |
|-  style="background:#cfc;"
| 2017-08-26 || Win ||align=left| Cedric Doumbe || Glory 44: Chicago|| Hoffman Estates, Illinois, USA || Decision (Split) || 5 || 3:00
|-
! style=background:white colspan=9 |
|-  style="background:#cfc;"
| 2017-06-10 || Win ||align=left| Harut Grigorian || Glory 42: Paris|| Paris, France || KO (Punch) || 2 || 
|-
|-  style="background:#cfc;"
| 2017-05-20 || Win ||align=left| Alan Scheinson || Glory 41: Holland|| Den Bosch,Netherlands || Decision (Split) || 3 || 3:00
|-
|-  style="background:#cfc;"
| 2017-02-24 || Win ||align=left| Thongchai Sitsongpeenong || Glory 38: Chicago|| Hoffman Estates, Illinois || TKO (Punches) || 3 || 1:45
|-
|-  style="background:#fbb;"
| 2016-10-21 || Loss ||align=left| Nieky Holzken || Glory 34: Denver || Broomfield, Colorado || Decision (Unanimous) || 5 || 3:00
|-
! style=background:white colspan=9 |
|-
|-  style="background:#cfc;"
| 2016-08-20 || Win ||align=left| Jonatan Oliveira || Kunlun Fight 50 – 80 kg Tournament, Quarter Finals || Jinan, China || TKO (3 Knockdowns Rule) || 2 || 1:04
|-  style="background:#cfc;"
| 2016-06-25 || Win ||align=left| Yoann Kongolo  || Glory 31: Amsterdam - Welterweight Contender Tournament, Final || Amsterdam, Netherlands || Decision (Unanimous)  || 3 || 3:00
|-
! style=background:white colspan=9 |
|-  style="background:#cfc;"
| 2016-06-25 || Win ||align=left| Karim Benmansour || Glory 31: Amsterdam - Welterweight Contender Tournament, Semi Finals || Amsterdam, Netherlands || TKO (3 Knockdowns Rule)  || 3 || 1:08
|-
|-  style="background:#fbb;"
| 2016-04-23 || Loss ||align=left| Artur Kyshenko || Kunlun Fight 43 || Zhoukou, China || Ext R. Decision  || 4 || 3:00
|-
|-  style="background:#cfc;"
| 2016-04-03 || Win ||align=left| Sem Braan || WFL - Where Heroes Meet Legends, Final|| Almere, The Netherlands || KO (Right cross) || 3 || 
|-
! style=background:white colspan=9 |
|-
|-  style="background:#cfc;"
| 2016-04-03 || Win ||align=left| Marco Pique || WFL - Where Heroes Meet Legends, Semi Final|| Almere, The Netherlands || Decision (Unanimous) || 3 || 3:00
|-  style="background:#fbb;"
| 2016-03-12 || Loss ||align=left| Cedric Doumbe || Glory 28: Paris || Paris, France || Decision (Unanimous) || 3 || 3:00
|-
|-  style="background:#fbb;"
| 2015-12-04 || Loss ||align=left| Nieky Holzken || Glory 26: Amsterdam || Amsterdam, Netherlands || Decision (Split) || 5 || 3:00
|-
! style=background:white colspan=9 |
|-
|-  style="background:#cfc;"
| 2015-11-06 || Win ||align=left| Karim Ghajji || Glory 25: Milan - Welterweight Contender Tournament, Final || Monza, Italy || Decision (Unanimous) || 3 || 3:00
|-
! style=background:white colspan=9 |
|-
|-  style="background:#cfc;"
| 2015-11-06 || Win ||align=left| Nicola Gallo || Glory 25: Milan - Welterweight Contender Tournament, Semi Finals || Monza, Italy || TKO (cut) || 2 || 1:03
|-
|-  style="background:#fbb;"
| 2015-08-07 || Loss ||align=left| Chad Sugden || Glory 23: Las Vegas || Las Vegas, Nevada, USA || Decision (split) || 3 || 3:00
|-
|-  style="background:#fbb;"
| 2015-01-03 || Loss ||align=left| Sitthichai Sitsongpeenong || Kunlun Fight 15: The World MAX Return - Middleweight Tournament, Semi Finals || Nanjing, China || KO (high kick)  || 3 || 
|-
|-  style="background:#cfc;"
| 2014-04-05 || Win ||align=left| Dzhabar Askerov || Legend 3: Pour Homme || Milan, Italy || KO (cartwheel kick) || 1 || 2:08
|-
|-  style="background:#cfc;"
| 2014-03-08 || Win ||align=left| Teo Mikelić || Glory 14: Zagreb || Zagreb, Croatia || TKO (cut) || 1 || 3:00
|-
|-  style="background:#fbb;"
| 2013-09-28 || Loss ||align=left| Davit Kiria || Glory 10: Los Angeles || Ontario, California, USA || Decision (unanimous) || 3 || 3:00
|-
|-  style="background:#cfc;"
| 2013-08-03 || Win ||align=left| Elizio Cabral || FightCult "BEATDOWN" || Paramaribo, Suriname || TKO (flying knee) || 1 ||
|-
|-  style="background:#fbb;"
| 2013-04-20 || Loss ||align=left| Robin van Roosmalen || Glory 7: Milan || Milan, Italy || Decision (unanimous) || 3 || 3:00
|-
|-  style="background:#cfc;"
| 2012-12-15 || Win ||align=left| Artur Kyshenko || K-1 World MAX 2012 World Championship Tournament Final, Final || Athens, Greece || KO (right overhand) || 3 || 0:54
|-
! style=background:white colspan=9 |
|-  style="background:#cfc;"
| 2012-12-15 || Win ||align=left| Mike Zambidis || K-1 World MAX 2012 World Championship Tournament Final, Semi Finals || Athens, Greece || TKO (doctor stopage/cut) || 2 || 3:00
|-  style="background:#cfc;"
| 2012-12-15 || Win ||align=left| Yasuhiro Kido || K-1 World MAX 2012 World Championship Tournament Final, Quarter Finals || Athens, Greece || KO (right high kick) || 1 || 1:47
|-  style="background:#cfc;"
| 2012-10-06 || Win ||align=left| Marc de Bonte || Glory 2: Brussels || Brussels, Belgium || KO (right knee) || 2 ||
|-  style="background:#cfc;"
| 2012-07-21 || Win ||align=left| Maximo Suarez || It's Showtime 59 || Tenerife, Spain || TKO (Doctor Stoppage) || 2 ||
|-  style="background:#cfc;"
| 2012-05-27 || Win ||align=left| Harut Grigorian || K-1 World MAX 2012 World Championship Tournament Final 16 || Madrid, Spain || KO (Superman punch and knees) || 3 || 2:00
|-  style="background:#cfc;"
| 2011-11-12 || Win ||align=left| Darryl Sichtman || Street Culture, Fight Club Group & Canary Kickboxing Federation presents: It’s Showtime 53 || Tenerife, Spain || Decision (Unanimous) || 3 || 3:00
|-  style="background:#fbb;"
| 2011-09-24 || Loss ||align=left| Artem Levin || BFN Group & Music Hall presents: It's Showtime "Fast & Furious 70MAX" || Brussels, Belgium || KO (Left Knee to the Body) || 5 || 1:51
|-
! style=background:white colspan=9 |
|-  style="background:#cfc;"
| 2011-06-18 || Win ||align=left| Rafi Zouheir || It's Showtime Madrid 2011 || Madrid, Spain || TKO (Corner Stoppage) || 1 || 2:16
|-  style="background:#cfc;"
| 2011-06-11 || Win ||align=left| Errol Koning || BFN Group presents: It's Showtime Warsaw || Warsaw, Poland || Decision (Split) || 3 || 3:00
|-  style="background:#fbb;"
| 2010-12-18 || Loss ||align=left| Khalid Bourdif || Fightclub presents: It's Showtime 2010 || Amsterdam, Netherlands || Decision || 3 || 3:00
|-  style="background:#fbb;"
| 2010-10-16 || Loss ||align=left| Nieky Holzken || United Glory 12: 2010–2011 World Series Quarterfinals || Amsterdam, Netherlands || Ext.R Decision || 4 || 3:00
|-  style="background:#cfc;"
| 2010-09-12 || Win ||align=left| Joep Beerenpoot || Fightingstars presents: It's Showtime 2010 || Amsterdam, Netherlands || KO (Right High Kick) || 1 ||
|-  style="background:#cfc;"
| 2010-04-17 || Win ||align=left| Daniel Géczi || It's Showtime 2010 Budapest || Budapest, Hungary || TKO || ||
|-  style="background:#cfc;"
| 2010-02-27 || Win ||align=left| Amir Zeyada || Amsterdam Fight Club 3 || Amsterdam, Netherlands || TKO (Doc Stop/Cut) || 1 ||
|-
! style=background:white colspan=9 |
|-  style="background:#fbb;"
| 2009-10-24 || Loss ||align=left| Ali Cenik || It's Showtime 2009 Lommel || Lommel, Belgium || KO (Overhand Right) || 2 || 
|-  style="background:#fbb;"
| 2009-08-29 || Loss ||align=left| Vladimir Moravcik || It's Showtime 2009 Budapest || Budapest, Hungary || Decision || 3 || 3:00 
|-  style="background:#cfc;"
| 2009-04-24 || Win ||align=left| Mehmet Aygun || Ergen Ring Atesi 4 || Istanbul, Turkey || KO (Left High Kick) || 3 ||
|-  style="background:#fbb;"
| 2009-03-14 || Loss ||align=left| Cosmo Alexandre || Oktagon presents: It's Showtime 2009 || Milan, Italy || Decision (Unanimous) || 3 || 3:00
|-  style="background:#cfc;"
| 2009-02-08 || Win ||align=left| Yassin Boudrouz || Fights at the Border presents: It's Showtime 2009 || Antwerp, Belgium || KO || 1 ||
|-  style="background:#fbb;"
| 2008-11-29 || Loss ||align=left| Sem Braan || It's Showtime 2008 Eindhoven || Eindhoven, Netherlands || Decision (Unanimous) || 3 || 3:00
|-  style="background:#cfc;"
| 2008-04-12 || Win ||align=left| Halim Issaoui || K-1 Italy Oktagon 2008, Final || Milan, Italy || KO || 3 ||
|-
! style=background:white colspan=9 |
|-  style="background:#cfc;"
| 2008-04-12 || Win ||align=left| Yassin Boudrouz || K-1 Italy Oktagon 2008, Semi Final || Milan, Italy || TKO || ||
|-  style="background:#cfc;"
| 2008-04-12 || Win ||align=left| Marco Santi || K-1 Italy Oktagon 2008, Quarter Final || Milan, Italy || KO || ||
|-  style="background:#fbb;"
| 2008-04-04 || Loss ||align=left| Gregory Choplin || It's Showtime Reality TV 2008 || Koh Samui, Thailand || Decision (Unanimous) || 3 || 3:00
|-  style="background:#cfc;"
| 2008-03-08 || Win  ||align=left| Jan de Keyzer || Gala Lommel || Lommel, Belgium || KO || 2 || 
|-  style="background:#c5d2ea;"
| 2008-02-09 || Draw  ||align=left| Matias Ipssa || North Disturbed || Amsterdam, Netherlands || Decision Draw || 5 || 3:00
|-  style="background:#cfc;"
| 2007-10-27 || Win ||align=left| Piotr Woźnicki || Angels of Fire II, Final || Płock, Poland || TKO || 1 ||
|-
! style=background:white colspan=9 |
|-  style="background:#cfc;"
| 2007-10-27 || Win ||align=left| Łukasz Rambalski || Angels of Fire II, Semi Final || Płock, Poland || TKO || 2 ||
|-  style="background:#cfc;"
| 2007-10-27 || Win ||align=left| Rafał Dudek || Angels of Fire II, Quarter Final || Płock, Poland || KO || 3 ||
|-  style="background:#cfc;"
| 2007-04-22 || Win  ||align=left| Benito Linger || Muay Thai Gala Landsmeer || Landsmeer, Netherlands || Decision || 5 || 2:00 
|-  style="background:#cfc;"
| 2007-02-04 || Win  ||align=left| Cedric Burgzorg || Muay Thai-MMA Gala Groningen || Groningen, Netherlands || Decision || 5 || 2:00
|-  style="background:#cfc;"
| 2006-12-16 || Win  ||align=left| Ilias Zbairi || Fight4Life Gala || Netherlands || KO || 2 || 
|-  style="background:#fbb;"
| 2006-10-01 || Loss ||align=left| Leroy Kaestner || SLAMM "Nederland vs Thailand II" || Almere, Netherlands || Decision (Unanimous) || 5 || 2:00
|-  style="background:#fbb;"
| 2006-03-19 || Loss  ||align=left| Lindo Prophase || SLAMM "Nederland vs Thailand" || Almere, Netherlands || Decision || 5 || 2:00
|-  style="background:#cfc;"
| 2006-02-06 || Win  ||align=left| Iliad Oufkir || Muay Thai Gala in Oostzaan || Oostzaan, Netherlands || TKO (Corner Stop/Knees) || 1 ||
|-  style="background:#cfc;"
| 2005-10-02 || Win  ||align=left| Karim Al Jouharati || It's Showtime 75MAX Trophy, 1st Round - Tilburg, Opening fight || Tilburg, Netherlands || TKO  || 5 ||
|-  style="background:#c5d2ea;"
| 2005-04-10 || Draw  ||align=left| Trevor Smandych || Urban Destruction 1 || Bristol, England || Decision  || 5 ||
|-  style="background:#cfc;"
| 2004-12-19 || Win ||align=left| Fahid Maroun || Gala Landsmeer || Landsmeer, Netherlands || Decision || 3 || 2:00 
|-  style="background:#cfc;"
| 2004-11-14 || Win  ||align=left| Guillermo Codrington || Muay Thai/Mixed Gala Kickass Fight Promotions || Almere, Netherlands || Decision || 3 || 2:00
|-  style="background:#cfc;"
| 2004-09-18 || Win  ||align=left| Earl Marica || Herring Gulls || Zaandam, Netherlands || Decision || 3 || 2:00
|-
| colspan=9 | Legend:

See also 
List of male kickboxers 
List of K-1 champions

References

External links
Official website
Profile at Glory

1986 births
Living people
Dutch male kickboxers
Surinamese male kickboxers
Lightweight kickboxers
Welterweight kickboxers
Middleweight kickboxers
Dutch sportspeople of Surinamese descent
Glory kickboxers
Kunlun Fight kickboxers
Sportspeople from Amsterdam